Wild at Heart: The Story of Sailor and Lula is a 1990 novel by Barry Gifford.

Critical reception
Publishers Weekly wrote: "In the visual equivalent of sound bites, novelist and poet Gifford ... cuts to the heart with sharply focused shots of young lovers on the lam." Kirkus Reviews wrote that "Gifford's South is ersatz, tarred up with Forget-Me-Not Cafes and Dixie beer, his Romeo and Juliet more treacly than tragic."

Series
Wild at Heart begins the adventures of two sex-driven, star-crossed protagonists, Sailor and Lula, on the road in the American South. 

It is followed by:

Sailor's Holiday: The Wild Life of Sailor and Lula
59° and Raining: The Story of Perdita Durango
Sultans of Africa
Consuelo's Kiss
Bad Day for the Leopard Man
Imagination of the Heart

Film
The novel was adapted to the film Wild At Heart (1990) written and directed by David Lynch and starring Nicolas Cage, Laura Dern and Willem Dafoe. The adaptation won the Palme d'Or, the highest honour at the Cannes Film Festival. The success of the film boosted interest in Gifford's novels.

References

1990 American novels
American novels adapted into films
Black comedy books